Stephen Edward Courtin (September 21, 1942 – August 6, 2022) was an American professional basketball player. He played college basketball for Saint Joseph's University, where as a senior in 1963–64 he was co-awarded the Robert V. Geasey Trophy as the Philadelphia Big 5's best player. Courtin was then selected in the 1964 NBA draft by the Cincinnati Royals. He played in 24 games during the 1964–65 season for the Philadelphia 76ers before moving on to two seasons in the Continental Basketball Association.

Courtin died on August 6, 2022, at the age of 79.

References

External links 

1942 births
2022 deaths
Allentown Jets players
American men's basketball players
Basketball players from Philadelphia
Cincinnati Royals draft picks
Harrisburg Patriots players
Philadelphia 76ers players
Saint Joseph's Hawks men's basketball players
Shooting guards